On Air with Ryan Seacrest was an American syndicated television talk show, which ran from January 12, 2004 through September 17, 2004. It was distributed in the United States and Canada by Twentieth Television.

Series background
The show was broadcast live from a studio in the Hollywood and Highland complex in Hollywood and featured a background view of the street scene below. The title came from his morning radio show of the same name, which also debuted in 2004 and later went nationwide as a daily syndicated radio series in 2008. It was recorded live at Noon pacific time, and aired at Noon on KCOP-TV, Los Angeles' UPN affiliate & there was an encore that aired at 5:00pm on KTTV, Los Angeles' Fox affiliate

On Air struggled in the ratings throughout its short run. It featured well-known guests, and capitalized upon the fact that host Ryan Seacrest concurrently hosted American Idol by featuring contestants who had been eliminated from the popular talent program the night before. 

Seacrest would return to daytime talk television thirteen years later, when he began working in New York City on May 1, 2017, as co-host of the syndicated talk show Live with Kelly and Ryan.

References

External links
 

2000s American television talk shows
2004 American television series debuts
2004 American television series endings
English-language television shows
First-run syndicated television programs in the United States
Television series by Ryan Seacrest Productions
Television series by 20th Century Fox Television